Jordi Tarrés (born 10 September 1966 in Rellinars, Spain) is a Spanish former international motorcycle trials rider. He competed in the FIM Trial World Championships from 1985 to 1997. Tarrés is notable for being a seven-time motorcycle trials world champion. He is the third most successful trials rider in history, after Dougie Lampkin with 12 titles (7 outdoor and 5 indoor) and Toni Bou with 32 (16 outdoor and 16 indoor). In 2010, Tarrés was named an FIM Legend for his motorcycling achievements.

References

External links 
 Jordi Tarrés official site 

1966 births
Living people
Sportspeople from Barcelona
Spanish motorcycle racers
Motorcycle racers from Catalonia
Motorcycle trials riders